Former cities of Latvia are entities that once had city rights and were located in the territory of Latvia. The main reasons why these entities have lost their status as cities of Latvia are destructions due to wars or mergers into larger entities.

See also
List of cities in Latvia

References

Populated places in Latvia
Cities, former
Former
Latvia